Birchenough is a surname. Notable people with the surname include:

 Henry Birchenough (1853–1937), English businessman and public servant
 Godwin Birchenough (1880–1953), British priest
 Birchenough Baronets